Anneaux d'or is a 1959 French Tunisian 14-minute short film directed by René Vautier and written by Sassi Rjeb. It stars Claudia Cardinale.
The film won the Best Short Film Suitable for Young People at the Berlin International Film Festival.

References

External links

Tunisian short films
1959 films
French short films
1959 short films
1950s French films